Fernando Mattos Costa (born 9 December 1958 in Montevideo) is a Uruguayan agronomist, businessman and politician.

A member of the Colorado Party, he is the Minister of Livestock, Agriculture, and Fisheries in the cabinet of Luis Lacalle Pou.

References 

Living people
1958 births
Federal University of Rio Grande do Sul alumni
Uruguayan agronomists
Uruguayan businesspeople
Colorado Party (Uruguay) politicians
Ministers of Livestock, Agriculture, and Fisheries of Uruguay